In mathematics, in the areas of group theory and combinatorics, Hall words provide a unique monoid factorisation of the free monoid. They are also totally ordered, and thus provide a total order on the monoid. This is analogous to the better-known case of Lyndon words; in fact, the Lyndon words are a special case, and almost all properties possessed by Lyndon words carry over to Hall words. Hall words are in one-to-one correspondence with Hall trees. These are binary trees; taken together, they form the Hall set. This set is a particular totally ordered subset of a free non-associative algebra, that is, a free magma. In this form, the Hall trees provide a basis for free Lie algebras, and can be used to perform the commutations required by the Poincaré–Birkhoff–Witt theorem used in the construction of a universal enveloping algebra. As such, this generalizes the same process when done with the Lyndon words. Hall trees can also be used to give a total order to the elements of a group, via the commutator collecting process, which is a special case of the general construction given below. It can be shown that Lazard sets coincide with Hall sets.

The historical development runs in reverse order from the above description. The commutator collecting process was described first, in 1934, by Philip Hall and explored in 1937 by Wilhelm Magnus. Hall sets were introduced by Marshall Hall based on work of Philip Hall on groups. 
Subsequently, Wilhelm Magnus showed that they arise as the graded Lie algebra associated with the filtration on a free group given by the lower central series. This correspondence was motivated by commutator identities in group theory due to Philip  Hall and Ernst Witt.

Hall set
The Hall set is a totally ordered subset of a free non-associative algebra, that is, a free magma. Parenthesis may be written with square brackets, so that elements of the free magma may be viewed as formal commutators.

The Hall set  can be constructed recursively (in increasing order) as follows:

 The Hall set contains the generators: 
 Either  (and thus ),
 The commutators can be ordered arbitrarily, provided that  always holds. 

The construction and notation used below are nearly identical to that used in the commutator collecting process, and so can be directly compared; the weights are the string-lengths. The difference is that no mention of groups is required. These definitions all coincide with that of X. Viennot. 
Note that some authors reverse the order of the inequality. Reversing the inequality does not reverse this "backwardness".

Example
The initial members of the Hall set are then (in order)

Notice that there are  elements of each distinct length.  This is the beginning sequence of the necklace polynomial in two elements (described next, below).

Combinatorics
A basic result is that the number of elements of length  in the Hall set (over  generators) is given by the necklace polynomial

where  is the classic Möbius function. The sum is a Dirichlet convolution.

Definitions and Lemmas
Some basic definitions are useful. Given a tree , the element  is called the immediate left subtree, and likewise,  is the immediate right subtree.

A basic lemma is that if  is a right subtree of a Hall tree , then

Hall words
Hall words are obtained from the Hall set by "forgetting" the commutator brackets, but otherwise keeping the notion of total order. It turns out that this "forgetting" is harmless, as the corresponding Hall tree can be deduced from the word, and it is unique.  That is, the Hall words are in one-to-one correspondence with the Hall trees. The total order on the Hall trees passes over to a total order on the Hall words.

This correspondence allows a monoid factorisation: given the free monoid , any element of  can be uniquely factorized into a ascending sequence of Hall words. This is analogous to, and generalizes the better-known case of factorization with Lyndon words provided by the Chen–Fox–Lyndon theorem.

More precisely, every word  can be written as a concatenation of Hall words

with each Hall word  being totally ordered by the Hall ordering:

In this way, the Hall word ordering extends to a total order on the monoid. The lemmas and theorems required to provide the word-to-tree correspondence, and the unique ordering, are sketched below.

Foliage
The foliage is just the string consisting of the leaves of the tree, that is, taking the tree written with commutator brackets, and erasing the commutator brackets.

Factorization of Hall words
Let  be a Hall tree, and  be the corresponding Hall word.

and 

with

and

This and the subsequent development below are given by Guy Melançon.

Correspondence
The converse to the above factorization establishes the correspondence between Hall words and Hall trees. This can be stated in the following interesting form:  if  is a Hall tree, and the corresponding Hall word  factorizes as

with

then . In other words, Hall words cannot be factored into a descending sequence of other Hall words. This implies that, given a Hall word, the corresponding tree can be uniquely identified.

Standard factorization
The total order on Hall trees passes over to Hall words. This is termed the standard factorization.

Standard sequence
A sequence of Hall words  is said to be a standard sequence if each  is either a letter, or a standard factorization  with   Note that increasing sequences of Hall words are standard.

Term rewriting
The unique factorization of any word  into a concatenation of an ascending sequence of Hall words 
with 
 can be achieved by defining and recursively applying a simple term rewriting system. The uniqueness of the factorization follows from the confluence properties of the system. The rewriting is performed by the exchange of certain pairs of consecutive Hall words in a sequence; it is given after these definitions.

A drop in a sequence  of Hall words is a pair  such that   If the sequence is a standard sequence, then the drop is termed a legal drop if one also has that 

Given a standard sequence with a legal drop, there are two distinct rewrite rules that create new standard sequences. One concatenates the two words in the drop:

while the other permutes the two elements in the drop:

It is not hard to show that both rewrites result in a new standard sequence.  In general, it is most convenient to apply the rewrite to the right-most legal drop; however, it can be shown that the rewrite is confluent, and so one obtains the same results no matter what the order.

Total order
A total order can be provided on the words   This is similar to the standard lexicographic order, but at the level of Hall words. Given two words  factored into ascending Hall word order, i. e. that
 and 
with each  a Hall word, one has an ordering that  if either 
 and 
or if 
 and

Properties
Hall words have a number of curious properties, many of them nearly identical to those for Lyndon words. The first and most important property is that Lyndon words are a special case of Hall words. That is, the definition of a Lyndon word satisfies the definition of the Hall word. This can be readily verified by direct comparison; note that the direction of the inequality used in the definitions above is exactly the reverse of that used in the customary definition for Lyndon words.  The set of Lyndon trees (which follow from the standard factorization) is a Hall set.

Other properties include:
 Hall words are acyclic, also known as primitive.
 A word  is a Hall word if and only if for any factorization of  into non-empty words obeys . In particular, this implies that no Hall word is a conjugate of another Hall word. Note again, this is exactly as it is for a Lyndon word: Lyndon words are the least of their conjugacy class; Hall words are the greatest.
 A word  is a Hall word if and only if it is larger than any of its proper right factors. This follows from the previous two points.
 Every primitive word  is conjugate to a Hall word. That is, there exists a circular shift of  that is a Hall word. Equivalently, there exists a factorization  such that  is a Hall word. This conjugate is unique, since no Hall word is a conjugate of another Hall word.
 Every word  is the conjugate of a power of a unique Hall word.

Implications
There is a similar term rewriting system for Lyndon words, this is how the factorization of a monoid is accomplished with Lyndon words.

Because the Hall words can be placed into Hall trees, and each Hall tree can be interpreted as a commutator, the term rewrite can be used to perform the commutator collecting process on a group.

Another very important application of the rewrite rule is to perform the commutations that appear in the Poincaré–Birkhoff–Witt theorem. A detailed discussion of the commutation is provided in the article on universal enveloping algebras.  Note that term rewriting with Lyndon words can also be used to obtain the needed commutation for the PBW theorem.

History
Hall sets were introduced by Marshall Hall based on work of Philip Hall on groups. Subsequently, Wilhelm Magnus showed that they arise as the graded Lie algebra associated with the filtration on a free group given by the lower central series. This correspondence was motivated by commutator identities in group theory due to Philip  Hall and Ernst Witt.

See also
 Hall–Petresco identity
 Markov odometer

References

Formal languages
Combinatorics on words